Jumana may refer to:
 Jumana (given name), an Arabic given name (including a list of people with the name)
 Jumana language, a language of Colombia
 Jumana people (Mexico and Texas), a historic ethnic group of North America

See also 
 Jumanah bint Abi Talib, cousin of the Islamic prophet Muhammad , and sister of imam Ali ibn Abi Talib
 Jamuna (disambiguation)